Formerly and historically titled The Brentford & Chiswick Times,   The Brentford, Chiswick & Isleworth Times was a weekly local newspaper covering news and events across mainly The Brentford and Chiswick areas and the Eastern part of The London Borough of Hounslow in London, United Kingdom.

It is no longer published.

Publication

It was published in tabloid format every Friday and was owned by Newsquest Media Group, and along with the other newspapers in the local group had an average circulation of 15,675.

The paper became based at offices in Twickenham, London, where the Richmond and Twickenham Times is also produced.

Other titles in the same local group

 Richmond and Twickenham Times

See also

List of newspapers in London

References

  1. Circulation report

External links
Richmond & Twickenham Times official site

Media and communications in the London Borough of Hounslow
London newspapers
Brentford, London
Chiswick
Isleworth